Agaricus bernardii, commonly called the salt-loving mushroom, is an agaric fungus  in the family Agaricaceae. Found in Asia, Europe, North America, New Zealand and Australia it is a salt-tolerant species that grows in salt marshes, dunes, and coastal grassland. The cap surface is whitish to buff, and can develop  scales or warts in age. Gills are initially pink before turning brown when the spores mature. The flesh turns reddish when it is cut or bruised. The mushroom somewhat resembles Agaricus bitorquis but it differs from that species by the reddish-brown staining of cap and stem tissue, the nature of the ring on the stem, as well as its briny odor. An edible mushroom, it is stronger in flavor but similar to the store-bought button mushrooms, Agaricus bisporus.

Taxonomy
The species was first described by French mycologist Lucien Quélet as Psalliota bernardi in 1879, based on collections made in La Rochelle, a seaport on the Bay of Biscay (France). Pier Andrea Saccardo transferred it to Agaricus in 1887. Synonyms include Psalliota bernardii, Pratella bernardii, Fungus bernardii, and Agaricus campestris subsp. bernardii.

The infrageneric (below genus-level) classification of A. bernardii is not known with certainty. In his 1978 proposed classification, Paul Heinemann placed it in the subsection Bitorques of the section Agaricus.  Although the species has some similarities with species in the section Duploannulatae based on the structure of its veil and its tendencies towards rufescence (developing a red coloration), molecular analysis shows that it does not belong in this section. An earlier (1999) analysis suggested that it is closely related to the "Agaricus clade", which contains A. subperonatus, A. devoniensis, A. bisporus, A. spissicaulis, A. bitorquis, and A. impudicus. In 1986, Henri Romagnesi placed it in section Chitonioides; Solomon Wasser demoted this to a subsection of Duploannulatae in 1995, and later provided molecular support for his decision. In addition to A. bernardii, species in Wasser's concept of subsection Chitonioides include A. rollanii, A. bernardiiformis, A. gennadii, A. pequinii, and A. nevoi.

The species was named after the original collector, G. Bernard. Agaricus bernardii is commonly known as the salt-loving mushroom.

Description

The cap surface is dry and smooth, with a white or buff color that can develop brownish spots in maturity. In age, the surface often forms scales or warts. The flesh is thick, firm, and stains reddish-orange or reddish-brown when cut, although this reaction can be slow to develop. Its odor ranges from mild to briny to pungent. The gills are free from attachment to the stem, and packed close together. Initially grayish-pink to pinkish, they turn reddish-brown and then chocolate brown as the spores mature. A thick, white, rubbery partial veil covers the gills of the immature mushroom, and eventually remains as a ring on the middle of the stem.

Although the mushrooms sometimes have an odor that is briny or pungent ("though not inappropriate"), they are edible and good. David Arora compares its taste to that of the closely related Agaricus bitorquis, "but a little chewier and sometimes with a slightly salty or briny taste."

Agaricus bernardii mushrooms produce a dark brown spore print. The spores are smooth, broadly elliptical, and have dimensions of 6–7.5 by 5–6 μm. The basidia (spore-bearing cells) are four-spored and club-shaped, measuring 14–25 by 4–7 μm; the sterigmata are 4–5 μm. Cheilocystidia (cystidia on the gill edge) are broadly club-shaped to cylindrical, hyaline (translucent), and measure 17–30 by 4–8 μm.

Similar species

Agaricus bitorquis, also edible, has a similar appearance, but can be distinguished by its double ring, and the lack of a fishy or briny odor. Additionally, A. bitorquis does not stain reddish when cut, and usually does not have a scaly or warty cap. The Hungarian species A. bernardiiformis, named for its similarity to A. bernardii, is distinguished from the latter by its smaller spores (6.2–8.2 by 5.4–6.2 μm) and its club-shaped cheilocystidia that measure 17–35 by 7–9.5 μm. MycoBank, however, considers the two species to be conspecific.

Habitat and distribution
Agaricus bernardii is a saprobic species. Its mushrooms fruit singly, scattered, or in groups on the ground. They grow in sandy soils, lawns, and in habitats with a high salt concentration, like along ocean coasts and salt marshes. Once primarily a maritime species, the fungus has spread inland to roadside verges where salt has been applied to de-ice the roads. Fruit bodies sometimes form underground. Mushrooms can also grow in fairy rings, especially when in grasslands or pastures. A Czech study determined that the mushrooms will strongly bioaccumulate silver from contaminated soil. Although the average concentration of silver in the soil is typically less than 1 milligram per kilogram of soil, it can be significantly elevated near industrial sites such as mines and smelters. The concentration of silver in the caps—which reached levels of up to 544 mg per kg of mushroom tissue (dry weight)—was about twice that of the stems.

The species is found in Asia, Europe, North America (including Mexico) and New Zealand.

See also

List of Agaricus species

References

External links
Mushroom Observer Images
Rogers Mushrooms Images and description

bernardii
Edible fungi
Fungi described in 1879
Fungi found in fairy rings
Fungi of Asia
Fungi of Europe
Fungi of New Zealand
Fungi of North America